Harrison Township is a township in Jewell County, Kansas, USA.  As of the 2000 census, its population was 52.

Geography
Harrison Township covers an area of 35.78 square miles (92.67 square kilometers).

Adjacent townships
 Montana Township (east)
 Richland Township (southeast)
 Holmwood Township (south)
 Burr Oak Township (southwest)
 Walnut Township (west)

Cemeteries
The township contains three cemeteries: Cleveland, Olive Hill and Shaffer.

References
 U.S. Board on Geographic Names (GNIS)
 United States Census Bureau cartographic boundary files

External links
 City-Data.com

Townships in Jewell County, Kansas
Townships in Kansas